Ned Kirby (born 1949 in Glanworth, County Cork) is an Irish former sportsperson. He played Gaelic football with his local clubs Glanworth and Grange and was a member of the Cork senior inter-county team from 1970 until 1974.

Honours

Cork
All-Ireland Senior Football Championship (1): 1973
Munster Senior Football Championship (3): 1971, 1973, 1974
Munster Junior Football Championship (1): 1970
All-Ireland Under-21 Football Championship (1): 1970
Munster Under-21 Football Championship (2): 1969, 1970
All-Ireland Minor Football Championship (1): 1967
Munster Minor Football Championship (2): 1966, 1967

References

1949 births
Living people
Glanworth Gaelic footballers
Cork inter-county Gaelic footballers